Tanglewood is an estate and music venue in Lenox and Stockbridge, Massachusetts.

Tanglewood may also refer to:

Places

United States
 Tanglewood (Akron, Alabama)
 Tanglewood, Florida
 Tanglewood, Indiana
 Tanglewood (Peewee Valley, Kentucky), 1869, see National Register of Historic Places listings in Oldham County, Kentucky
 Tanglewood (Magnolia, Mississippi), 1850, see National Register of Historic Places listings in Pike County, Mississippi
 Tanglewood (Chillicothe, Ohio), a historic house built in 1850
 Tanglewood Plantation, Lynchburh, South Carolina, 1850, an Historic Place listings in South Carolina
 Tanglewood Historic District, listed on the National Register of Historic Places listings in Davidson County, Tennessee
 Tanglewood, Houston, a neighborhood in Houston, Texas
 Tanglewood (Maidens, Virginia), a historic hotel and tavern built in 1929
 Tanglewood Island, Washington

Canada
 Tanglewood, Ottawa, a neighbourhood in Ottawa

Arts, entertainment, and media
 Tanglewood Tales (1853), a book by Nathaniel Hawthorne
 Tanglewood (1987 video game)
 "Tanglewood", a first season episode of CSI: NY
 Tanglewood (2018 video game)
 Tanglewood Festival Chorus, a chorus which performs with the Boston Symphony Orchestra and Boston Pops

Other uses
 Tukwila (processor), a computer processor once codenamed Tanglewood
 Tanglewood Guitars, a British guitar manufacturer
 Tanglewood Mall, a Virginia shopping mall
 Tanglewood Park, a golf course and park in Forsyth County, North Carolina
 Tanglewood Middle School shooting, a 2022 fatal school shooting Greenville County, South Carolina